The 1972–73 Football League season was Birmingham City Football Club's 70th in the Football League and their 39th in the First Division, to which they were promoted as Second Division runners-up in 1971–72. After spending much of the season in the lower reaches of the table, eight wins and a draw from the last ten matches brought them up to tenth position in the 22-team division. They entered the 1972–73 FA Cup at the third round proper and lost in that round to Swindon Town, and entered the League Cup in the second round, eliminated in the fourth by Blackpool.

Twenty-seven players made at least one appearance in nationally organised first-team competition, and there were fourteen different goalscorers. Centre-forward Bob Latchford played in all but one of the 48 first-team matches over the season, and finished as leading goalscorer with 20 goals, of which 19 came in league competition. The home attendance in First Division matches never fell below 30,000.

Football League First Division

League table (part)

FA Cup

League Cup

Appearances and goals

Numbers in parentheses denote appearances as substitute.
Players with name struck through and marked  left the club during the playing season.
Players with names in italics and marked * were on loan from another club for the whole of their season with Birmingham.

See also
Birmingham City F.C. seasons

References
General
 
 
 Source for match dates and results: 
 Source for lineups, appearances, goalscorers and attendances: Matthews (2010), Complete Record, pp. 380–81.

Specific

Birmingham City F.C. seasons
Birmingham City